Kürdüvan (also, Kyurdevan, Kyurduvan, and Kyurdyuvan) is a village in the Ismailli Rayon of Azerbaijan.  The village forms part of the municipality of Zeyvə.

References 

Populated places in Ismayilli District